The "Cornfield Bomber" is the nickname given to a  Convair F-106 Delta Dart, operated by the 71st Fighter-Interceptor Squadron of the United States Air Force. In 1970, during a training exercise, it made an unpiloted landing in a farmer's field in Montana, suffering only minor damage, after the pilot had ejected from the aircraft. The aircraft, recovered and repaired, was returned to service, and is currently on display at the National Museum of the United States Air Force.

History

The individual aircraft was manufactured by Convair in 1958 and received the tail number 58-0787. It served with 71st Fighter-Interceptor Squadron based at Malmstrom Air Force Base adjacent to Great Falls, Montana. During a routine training flight conducting aerial combat maneuvers on February 2, 1970, the aircraft entered a flat spin. The pilot, First. Lieutenant Gary Foust, attempted to recover, deploying the aircraft's drag chute as a last resort; recovery proved to be impossible.

The reduction in weight and change in center of gravity caused by the removal of the pilot, coupled with the blast force of his seat rocketing out of the plane pushing the nose of the aircraft down, which had been trimmed by Foust for takeoff and idle throttle, caused the aircraft to recover from the spin. One of the other pilots on the mission was reported to have radioed Foust during his descent by parachute that "you'd better get back in it!". From his parachute, Foust watched incredulously as the now-pilotless aircraft descended and skidded to a halt in a farmer's field near Big Sandy, Montana. Foust drifted into the nearby mountains. He was later rescued by local residents using snowmobiles.

Shortly thereafter the local sheriff and local residents arrived at the scene of the crash. The thrust from the still-idling jet engine allowed the aircraft to slowly drift on its belly along a field. The sheriff, having contacted the air base, was informed that he should simply allow the jet to run out of fuel, which occurred an hour and forty-five minutes later without further incident. A recovery crew from McClellan Air Force Base arrived on the scene and began to dismantle the aircraft, removing its wings for transport aboard a railroad flat car. The damage to the aircraft was minimal; indeed, one officer on the recovery crew is reported to have stated that if there were any less damage he would have simply flown the aircraft out of the field.

Preservation

Following its misadventure, the "Cornfield Bomber" was repaired and returned to service, operating with the 49th Fighter-Interceptor Squadron, the final Air Force unit to operate the F-106. Foust flew the aircraft again in 1979 while training at Tyndall Air Force Base. Upon its retirement, it was presented to the National Museum of the United States Air Force in August 1986, where it remains on display.

See also
 1989 Belgium MiG-23 crash
 Battle of Palmdale

References

Notes

Bibliography

External links

Short documentary on the Cornfield Bomber on AVweb
National Museum of the Airforce videos page, with pilot interview
Cornfield Bomber video, National Museum of the U.S. Air Force, YouTube

1970 in the United States
Accidents and incidents involving United States Air Force aircraft
Aviation accidents and incidents in the United States in 1970
Aviation accidents and incidents in Montana
Military in Montana
Individual aircraft
F-106 Cornfield Bomber
1970 in Montana
February 1970 events in the United States